New Grub Street is a novel by George Gissing published in 1891, which is set in the literary and journalistic circles of 1880s London. Gissing revised and shortened the novel for a French edition of 1901.

Plot
The story deals with the literary world that Gissing himself had experienced. Its title refers to the London street, Grub Street, which in the 18th century became synonymous with hack literature; by Gissing's time, Grub Street itself no longer existed, though hack-writing certainly did. Its two central characters are a sharply contrasted pair of writers: Edwin Reardon, a novelist of some talent but limited commercial prospects, and a shy, cerebral man; and Jasper Milvain, a young journalist, hard-working and capable of generosity, but cynical and only semi-scrupulous about writing and its purpose in the modern (i.e. late Victorian) world.

New Grub Street opens with Milvain, an "alarmingly modern young man" driven by pure financial ambition in navigating his literary career.  He accepts that he will "always despise the people [he] write[s] for," networks within the appropriate social circle to create opportunity, and authors articles for popular periodicals.  Reardon, on the other hand, prefers to write novels of a more literary bent and refuses to pander to contemporary tastes until, as a last-gasp measure against financial ruin, he attempts a popular novel.  At this venture, he is of course too good to succeed, and he's driven to separate from his wife, Amy Reardon, née Yule, who cannot accept her husband's inflexibly high standards—and consequent poverty.

The Yule family includes Amy's two uncles—John, a wealthy invalid, and Alfred, a species of critic—and Alfred's daughter, and research assistant, Marian.  The friendship that develops between Marian and Milvain's sisters, who move to London following their mother's death, provides opportunity for the former to meet and fall in love with Milvain.  However much Milvain respects Marian's intellectual capabilities and strength of personality, the crucial element (according to him) for marriage is missing:  money.  Marrying a rich woman, after all, is the most convenient way to speed his career.  Indeed, Milvain slights romantic love as a key to marriage:

As a rule, marriage is the result of a mild preference, encouraged by circumstances, and deliberately heightened into strong sexual feeling.  You, of all men, know well enough that the same kind of feeling could be produced for almost any woman who wasn't repulsive.

Eventually, reason enough for an engagement is provided by a legacy of £5,000 left to Marian by John Yule.

Life and death eventually end the possibility of this union.  Milvain's initial career advancement is a position on The Current, a paper edited by Clement Fadge.  Twenty years earlier, Alfred Yule (Marian's father) was slighted by Fadge in a newspaper article, and the resulting acerbic resentment extends even to Milvain.  Alfred refuses to countenance Marian's marriage; but his objection proves to be an obstacle to Milvain only after Yule's eyesight fails and Marian's legacy is reduced to a mere £1,500.  As a result, Marian must work to provide for her parent, and her inheritance is no longer available to Milvain.

By this time, Milvain already has detected a more desirable target for marriage:  Amy Reardon.  Reardon's poverty and natural disposition toward ill-health culminate in his death following a brief reconciliation with his wife.  She, besides the receipt of £10,000 upon John Yule's death, has the natural beauty and grace to benefit a man in the social events beneficial to his career.  Eventually Amy and Milvain marry; however, as the narrator reveals, this marriage motivated by circumstances is not lacking in more profound areas.  Milvain, it is said, has married the woman he loves, although the narrator never states this as a fact, merely reporting it as something others have said about Milvain. In fact, in a conversation that ends the book, the reader is left to question whether Milvain is in fact haunted by his love for Marian, and his ungentlemanly actions in that regard.

Characters
Jasper Milvain — an "alarmingly modern young man" who rejects artistic integrity for financial gain and social prominence.  After a broken engagement with Marian Yule, Milvain marries her cousin (and Edwin Reardon's widow), Amy, who received a legacy of £10,000 on her uncle's death.  By the novel's end, Milvain secures an editorship of a periodical "The Current" partly due to determination, partly due to largesse made possible by his wife's inheritance.
Edwin Reardon — a talented writer of uncommercial novels.  A modicum of early critical praise is disappointed after his marriage to Amy Yule (and fathering of Willie), when Reardon is unable to provide for his family through his chosen profession.  After Reardon fails, he takes refuge in the steady income of a clerkship proffered by a friend.  Reardon is deserted by his wife, who cannot endure poverty and social degradation. They are briefly reconciled when their child becomes ill and dies; but Reardon, whose health has been broken by depression and poor living, is himself seriously ill, and his death soon follows.
Alfred Yule — writer.  Yule is a vehement foe of Clement Fadge, the editor who provided Milvain's first break.  His frustrations over meagre financial prospects and a stalled career are repeatedly visited on his wife whose lower-class background and limited education are a continual source of irritation. He dies blind.
Marian Yule — cousin of Amy Reardon and daughter of Alfred Yule. A sympathetic portrait of a woman torn between family ties, the possibility of marriage, and the need to earn a living. Loyal to her fiancee Jasper Milvain, she ultimately is forced to acknowledge that he is not prepared to marry her after her financial circumstances have been reduced, and indeed does not even love her. She breaks off the engagement, despite still being in love with him.
Harold Biffen — habitually (almost contentedly) down-and-out friend of Reardon.  Biffen scrapes an existence from tutoring. The novel he has worked on for many years is eventually published but attracts little notice. Running out of money, and unwilling to ask his brother for more, he commits suicide.
Dora Milvain — Jasper Milvain's younger sister, who moves to London following her mother's death.  With Jasper's encouragement, Dora enters onto a career writing for children and encounters early success.  Eventually, she marries Mr. Whelpdale.
Maud Milvain — Jasper Milvain's sister, who also moves to London following her mother's death.  Begins writing as well, but is not as ambitious as her sister.  She marries the wealthy Mr. Dolomore.
Mr. Whelpdale — friend of Milvain and future husband of Dora Milvain.  Whelpdale is a compulsive lover with four broken engagements behind him (in each, the woman's choice).  Having abandoned fiction-writing, Whelpdale concentrates on a business assisting clients in publishing and revising novels.  Eventually, his business finds commercial backing. The character of Whelpdale is based on Lord Northcliffe. At the time of writing, Northcliffe published a few inexpensive weekly papers, most notably Answers — he would later go on to become the preeminent figure in Edwardian popular journalism.

Publication history
1891, UK, Smith, Elder, hardback (3 volume first edition)
1904, USA, Brewster, hardback (1 volume)
2002, New York, Modern Library, paperback
2009, New Grub Street: The 1901 Revised Text, edited by Paul Delany. Victoria: ELS Editions

Later references
The BBC Radio 4 sitcom Ed Reardon's Week contains characters loosely suggested by the novel.

References

Sources
 Hansen, Harry (1926). "Introduction" to New Grub Street. New York: The Modern Library, pp. v–xii.
 Goldring, Douglas (1920). "An Outburst on Gissing." In: Reputations. London: Chapman & Hall, pp. 125–132.
 Hicks, Granville (1939). "The Changing Novel." In: Figures in Transition. New York: The Macmillan Company, pp. 179–203.
 Lang, Andrew (1891). "Realism in New Grub Street," The Author, Vol. II, pp. 43–44.
 
 Thomas, J.D. (1953). "The Public Purposes of George Gissing," Nineteenth-Century Fiction, Vol. VIII, No. 2, pp. 118–123.

External links 

 
  (plain text and HTML)
 
 Bobby Seal's article on New Grub Street on the London Fictions website
New Grub Street at Internet Archive (scanned books original editions color illustrated)

1891 British novels
Novels by George Gissing
Novels set in London
Novels about journalists
Victorian novels
Novels set in the 19th century